Huang Tien-fu (born 1938) is a Taiwanese politician.

Education
Huang studied political science at National Taiwan University.

Political career and activism
Huang ran for a seat on the Legislative Yuan in 1980, a year after his elder brother Huang Hsin-chieh was arrested for leading the Kaohsiung Incident. Relatives of other people involved in the Kaohsiung Incident also contested the 1980 election cycle and won, namely Chou Ching-yu and Hsu Jung-shu. While in office, Huang published several magazines affiliated with the tangwai movement, among them Vertical-Horizontal, Political Monitor, and Bell Drum Tower. Copies of the fifth issue of Bell Drum Tower were confiscated by the Kuomintang party-state in May 1983, and Political Monitor was suspended in November. After losing reelection in December, Huang founded Neo Formosa Weekly in June 1984. Neo Formosa Weekly also drew the attention of the government, which banned all but one of its 52 issues. On 19 June 1984, "A Critique of New Marxism" was published in Neo Formosa Weekly, accusing Elmer Fung of plagiarism. Fung sued the magazine for libel in October. On 12 January 1985, the Taipei District Court sentenced Chen Shui-bian, Lee I-yang and Huang Tien-fu to a year's imprisonment. Upon appeal to the Taiwan High Court, all three sentences were shortened to eight months. The trio were released in February 1987. Huang contested the 1989 Legislative Yuan primary for Taipei, but lost. By forming an electoral coalition with Shen Fu-hsiung, Yeh Chu-lan, and Yen Chin-fu, Huang was elected to the Third Legislative Yuan. After Chen Shui-bian won the 2000 presidential election, he offered Huang a position as senior adviser, which Huang held through 2006. Days before the 2008 presidential election, Huang stated, "I'm afraid that Taiwan will become the next Tibet. If the KMT wins the election, we don't know when we will [get the presidency] back." He served the Tsai Ing-wen administration as national policy adviser. In May 2022, the Transitional Justice Commission overturned libel charges against Huang dating back to his tenure on the Neo Formosa Weekly staff.

Huang's wife Lan Mei-chin has also served on the Legislative Yuan.

References

1938 births
Living people
Democratic Progressive Party Members of the Legislative Yuan
Members of the 1st Legislative Yuan in Taiwan
Taipei Members of the Legislative Yuan
Members of the 3rd Legislative Yuan
Taiwanese prisoners and detainees
Prisoners and detainees of Taiwan
Senior Advisors to President Chen Shui-bian
National Taiwan University alumni
Senior Advisors to President Tsai Ing-wen
Taiwanese editors
Taiwanese founders
Taiwanese publishers (people)
Spouses of Taiwanese politicians